Daglipulli is a locality in Ranco Province, Los Ríos Region, southern Chile. It is located on the western (or right) bank of Llollelhue River. As of 1899 Daglipulli had 640 inhabitants.

Daglipulli was established in 1788 as a mission for indigenous tribes. In 1844 the church was built anew.

References

Populated places in Ranco Province
Spanish missions in Chile
1788 establishments in the Captaincy General of Chile